The 1959 NCAA College Division basketball tournament involved 32 schools playing in a single-elimination tournament to determine the national champion of men's basketball in the NCAA College Division, predecessor to today's NCAA Divisions II and III, as a culmination of the 1958–59 NCAA College Division men's basketball season. It was won by the University of Evansville, and Evansville's Hugh Ahlering was named Most Outstanding Player.

Regional participants

Regionals

South Central - Tuskegee, Alabama
Location: Logan Hall Host: Tuskegee Institute

Third Place - Lincoln 88, Tuskegee 64

East - Garden City, New York
Location: Woodruff Hall Host: Adelphi College

Third Place - Adelphi 69, Wesleyan 63

Northeast - Winooski, Vermont
Location: unknown Host: Saint Michael's College

Third Place - Buffalo 78, Williams 53

Mideast - Evansville, Indiana
Location: Roberts Municipal Stadium Host: Evansville College

Third Place - Belmont Abbey 79, Southern Illinois 70

Great Lakes - Glen Ellyn, Illinois
Location: Glenbard High School Gym Host: Wheaton College

Third Place - Wabash 100, Loras 79

Southwest - Springfield, Missouri
Location: McDonald Hall and Arena Host: Southwest Missouri State College

Third Place - Abilene Christian 85, Western Illinois 81*

Midwest - Brookings, South Dakota
Location: The Barn Host: South Dakota State College

Third Place - Wartburg 69, Augustana 66*

Pacific Coast - Los Angeles, California
Location: Eagle's Nest Host: California State University, Los Angeles

Third Place - Willamette 76, Sacramento State 57

*denotes each overtime played

National Finals - Evansville, Indiana
Location: Roberts Municipal Stadium Host: Evansville College

Third Place - North Carolina A&T 101, Cal State Los Angeles 84

*denotes each overtime played

All-tournament team
 Hugh Ahlering (Evansville)
 Paul Benes (Hope)
 Joe Cotton (North Carolina A&T)
 Leo Hill (Cal State-Los Angeles)
 Jack Israel (Southwest Missouri State)

See also
 1959 NCAA University Division basketball tournament
 1959 NAIA Basketball Tournament

References

Sources
 2010 NCAA Men's Basketball Championship Tournament Records and Statistics: Division II men's basketball Championship
 1959 NCAA College Division Men's Basketball Tournament jonfmorse.com

NCAA Division II men's basketball tournament
Tournament
NCAA College Division basketball tournament
NCAA College Division basketball tournament